Liberty Avenue is a major thoroughfare starting in downtown Pittsburgh, Pennsylvania, United States, just outside Point State Park. Liberty Ave. runs through Downtown Pittsburgh, the Strip District, Bloomfield, and ends in the neighborhood of Shadyside at its intersection with Centre Avenue and Aiken Avenue. Liberty Avenue is about 4.3 miles (6.9 km) long.

A survey of Pittsburgh in 1784 already shows a Liberty Street in its present location. It is also called Liberty Street in a map from 1860.

Downtown

Beginning in the 19th century, the thoroughfare became a place of middle- and upper-class commerce. A history of Pittsburgh notes that a Market House was established in 1832 along Liberty Street between Sixth Street and Cecil Alley. Liberty also hosted food suppliers, brewers, and small manufacturers. In 1894, the Joseph Horne department store was built there. In the early 20th century, the Clark Building (named for the Clark candy company) and the Second National Bank were built. At length, it became a home for theater and movies, with the Stanley Theatre, the Lowe's Penn and the Harris Theatre. However, much of this activity was checked, first by the Great Depression, and then by the St. Patrick's Day Flood of 1936. Some businesses were closed, and others moved elsewhere.

A section of Liberty Avenue in Downtown Pittsburgh became a red-light district in the 1970s and 1980s, hosting the city's sex industry, including burlesque houses, strip bars, and peep shows, and attracting vice and crime. The Pittsburgh Cultural Trust, formed in 1984, worked over the next 25 years to transform the area into the Cultural District, a center for the arts, eventually bringing the August Wilson Center for African American Culture, Bricolage Production Company, Pittsburgh Playwrights Theatre Company, the Pittsburgh Cultural Trust Arts Education Center, and a museum of cartoon art, The ToonSeum, to Liberty Avenue.

Liberty Avenue in the downtown area underwent an years-long extensive $3.6 million redesign and repavement that was completed by 1991.

Strip District

Liberty Ave. is a main road through the Strip District. It is the home to many businesses, mostly offices and business-to-business service and product providers. The factory to manufacture George Westinghouse's air brakes was located at 2425 Liberty. This has now become the home of the Pittsburgh Opera. There are few retail establishments on Liberty Ave. in the Strip District.

Bloomfield

Liberty Ave. is the site of the main business district in Bloomfield. Liberty Ave. is also home to West Penn Hospital as well as many small store fronts.

Popular culture

A semi-fictionalized version of Liberty Avenue is featured prominently in the American version of the television program Queer as Folk.

References

Streets in Pittsburgh
Historical red-light districts in the United States